Jai Ho is a 2014 Indian Hindi-language political action film directed by Sohail Khan, who also produced the film under the banner Sohail Khan Productions, and co-produced by Sunil Lulla of Eros International, which distributed the film. It stars Salman Khan, Tabu, Daisy Shah, Danny Denzongpa and Aditya Pancholi. It also features Sunil Shetty and Genelia D'Souza in cameo appearances.

The film is an official remake of the Telugu film Stalin (2006), directed by A. R. Murugadoss, which is also inspired from the American-drama film Pay It Forward.

Jai Ho was released on 24 January 2014, during the Republic Day weekend. It received mixed reviews from critics. However, the film grossed  at the box office, becoming the sixth highest grossing bollywood film of 2014

Plot 
Jai Agnihotri  is an ex-army officer who is short-tempered and passionate about helping citizens and fighting criminals. He was a major in the Indian Army, but was suspended after he ignored orders from his superiors by rescuing a group of children from terrorists. After this incident, Jai moved in with his mother and sister Geeta.

One day, Jai is unable to help Suman, a physically disabled girl, take an examination while her brother was stuck in a traffic jam. A depressed Suman commits suicide. Jai is greatly disturbed by this incident. With Suman's death fresh in his mind, Jai creates a system that would encourage citizens to help each other. Each day, citizens are to help three people. These three people would in turn help three more people, and so on. Jai believes that this network would foster kindness and a sense of community among the citizens. His system, however, faces challenges.

On one occasion, for one of his daily good deeds, Jai loses his temper and beats a rich man who had injured a child beggar. In an act of revenge, the rich man calls some men to kidnap Geeta and her friend Rinky. Jai is able to save Geeta and Rinky, but injures one of the captors in the process, who happens to be the henchman of a member of the Legislative Assembly named Patil, the son-in-law of the Home Minister Dashrath Singh.

Dashrath is not happy that Jai has injured one of Patil's henchmen. He attempts to avenge this injury by kidnapping Jai's nephew Kabir. Dashrath, however, loses Patil out of Jai's rage in the process. Chief Minister Ashok Pradhan  meanwhile finds out about Jai's system after his own life is saved by a schoolgirl performing her good deeds for the day. He decides to intervene in the dispute between Dashrath and Jai in an attempt to put an end to their fight. Dashrath, who does not appreciate this intervention, attempts to kill Ashok and frame Jai. However, Jai is able to save Ashok.

Dashrath spreads rumours that Jai had attempted to assassinate Ashok. Meanwhile, Dashrath's son and his hired men attack Jai, who kills Dashrath's son, but not before the latter is severely injured after getting stabbed by his sister and Patil's widow, Kavita  and she gets stabbed and dies. A rickshaw driver and Jai's former colleague, Army Officer Arjun Kaul, together help Jai get to the hospital. While Jai is at the hospital, Ashok recovers and reveals that it was Dashrath and not Jai who was behind the attempted murder. An enraged crowd beats Dashrath to near death after hearing the truth.

Doctors are able to save Jai, who has survived, thanks to his own help-three-people concept. When Jai emerges from the hospital, he finds thousands of people waiting for him. Jai thanks them all for making his concept a success.

Cast 
Salman Khan as Jai Agnihotri, Geeta's brother and Rinky's love interest
Tabu as Geeta Agnihotri Khanna, Jai's sister
Daisy Shah as Rinky Shah, Jai's love interest
Danny Denzongpa as Home Minister Dashrath Singh
Aditya Pancholi as Inspector Dilip Kadam
Mahesh Manjrekar as Bablesh "Babban" Behl
Sharad Kapoor as Inspector Imran Siddiqui
Mukul Dev as Shrikant Patil, Kavita's husband
Haroon Qazi as Dashrath Singh's son and Kavita Singh Patil's brother
Nadira Babbar as Sulochna Agnihotri, Jai's mother
Pulkit Samrat as Abhay Rajput
 Mohnish Bahl as Chief Minister Ashok Pradhan
Sana Khan as Kavita Singh Patil, Patil's wife and Dashrath Singh's daughter
Resham Tipnis as Meghna Shah, Jai's to-be mother-in-law and Rinky's mother
Ashmit Patel as Sumit Mohile
Yash Tonk as Balbir "Babu" Ramchandran
Mahesh Thakur as Rehaan Khanna, Jai's brother-in-law
Naman Jain as Kabir Khanna, Jai's nephew
Tulip Joshi as Mrs. Anjali D’Souza
Varun Badola as Ronnie D'Souza
Bruna Abdullah as Anne Rosselline
Sudesh Lehri as Pandit Kaushal Chand Sharma
Santosh Shukla as Manik Singh
Jeetu Verma as Subhash Prasad Agashe
 Vatsal Sheth as Harjeet
Nauheed Cyrusi as Simran
Raju Mavani as Rajkishan Gupta

Cameo
 Sunil Shetty as Captain Arjun Kaul, Jai's friend
 Genelia D'Souza as Suman
 Vikas Bhalla as Suman's brother

Production

Development

In late 2012, Sohail Khan announced he planned to remake the Telugu film Stalin starring Chiranjeevi Konidela and Trisha Krishna. Khan originally titled the remake Mental, but by the time the film was released, it had been re-titled Jai Ho.

Filming

Shooting for the film was set to begin 27 February 2013 but was postponed until late March. There were rumors that the film would be released in 3D, but Sohail Khan was cited stating, "First, let me complete my film in the normal format. Then I'll take a call".

Marketing 
Salman Khan unveiled the first look poster of Jai Ho on 6 December 2013. The poster consisted of images of thousands of fans digitally merged to create one portrait of Khan. Khan's fans designed this poster. The makers unveiled the film's official teaser on 13 December 2013. The official trailer of the film was released on 3 January 2014.

Reception

Critical response

India Today gave Jai Ho a 3 out of 5 and commented that it was a rip off of Ek Tha Tiger with mindless action. Anupama Chopra gave the movie a 2.5 out of 5, stating, Jai Ho was more of a cartoon than a film.

Raja Sen of Rediff gave the film 2 out of 5 stars and said, Khan, Bollywood's real-life answer to Derek Zoolander, does his thing like only he can. And the crowd responds. Sitting in a single-screen theatre, the air was filled with shrill, thrilled whistles as soon as the censor certificate hit the screen. The first glimpse of Khan – via braceleted wrist – had the crowd in paroxysms." Rajeev Masand of CNN-IBN gave 2 stars out of 5, commenting "To be honest, very little stays with you when you leave the cinema, aside from the unpleasant aftertaste that comes from being shamelessly manipulated."

Taran Adarsh gave it 4.5 stars out of 5 and called it a "noble, well-intentioned message narrated in an entertaining format".

Box office
Jai Ho was released on around 3900 screens in India and 650 screens in overseas. The domestic and overseas theatrical rights were sold for ₹1.1 billion ($16 million). Jai Ho spent around ₹40 crore ($5.9 million) on the production of the film. The film cost around ₹650 million ($9.6 million) total with the cost of marketing and prints added, but this number still does not include Khan's remuneration. The satellite rights were sold for 50 crore ($7.4 million), and music rights were also sold for 12 crore ($1.8 million).

Jai Ho suffered losses from piracy. A Dubai-based user uploaded a pirated version of the film to YouTube on 28 January 2014. The video had 108,151 views by the time it was removed on 1 February 2014. Another version of the film was uploaded on 2 February 2014. DNA Films reported that Khan had requested that ticket prices be kept at the minimum so that people could afford to see the movie because of its message.

India
The website Boxofficeindia.com said that Jai Ho opened well at single screens like Jodhpur, Lucknow, Indore, Uttar Pradesh, Rajasthan and CI, with an occupancy of 80–100%, 25–30% better than Dhoom 3 and Chennai Express, and moderately well (50%) at multiplexes of Delhi, Punjab, Bangalore and Kolkata. It had an opening-day collection of around  nett. Jai Ho had a noticeable drop on Tuesday as it grossed around 7.75 crore nett taking the five-day total to a little over 74 crore nett. Jai Ho emerged as the fifth highest weekend of all time in terms of worldwide gross by managing to gross 200 crore worldwide in three days. Jai Ho had the ninth highest first week of all time as it grossed  nett in its first week. The film nett. grossed 3 crore nett on its second Friday. The film has collected 90 crores nett in 9 days. Jai Ho collected 13.50 crore nett in its second weekend taking its domestic total 95 crore nett in 10 days. Jai Hai has been made tax-free in Gujarat and Uttar Pradesh. Jai Ho two-week business was around 101.50 crore nett as it crossed around 21.29 crore nett in its second week. Jai ho on its third Friday had collections set to be around 50 lakhs nett, with tax exemption in Gujarat also. Jai Ho grossed around 2.25–2.50 crore nett in its third weekend taking the business to 105.50 crore nett after seventeen days. The two-week distributor share of film is 56 crore. Jai Ho took its total to 107 crore nett in after three weeks as it added around 4 crore nett in third week. Bollywoodhungama declared the total net gross of Jai Ho 116 crore, and ranked it the seventh highest-grossing movie of 2014 and Salman Khan's seventh 100 crore movie in a row, an all-time record in the history of Indian cinema.

Overseas
The website, Bollywoodhungama.com estimated Jai Ho grossed $3.55 million overseas in its first weekend. Box Office India estimated it grossed slightly less at $3.45 million and called it "decent business". The final overseas gross for Jai Ho was $6 million making it one of the highest overseas grossing Bollywood films of 2014.

Music 

Sajid–Wajid, Amaal Mallik and Devi Sri Prasad composed the nine-song soundtrack album for Jai Ho, in which Malik had contributed three tracks and Prasad had contributed one track, while the former composed 5 tracks. Sajid, Irfan Kamal, Danish Sabri, Sameer Anjaan, Kausar Munir, Shabbir Ahmed, Armaan Malik, and Devi Sri Prasad wrote the lyrics for all the songs in the album. The full soundtrack album was released on 3 January 2014.

See also 
 Bollywood films of 2014

References

External links 

2010s Hindi-language films
Hindi remakes of Telugu films
2014 action drama films
Indian action drama films
Films about corruption in India
Films scored by Sajid–Wajid
Films scored by Devi Sri Prasad